The 2013 World Allround Speed Skating Championships took place between 16 and 17 February 2013, at Vikingskipet in Hamar, Norway.

Sven Kramer won the men's title for a record sixth time. Ireen Wüst won the women's title for the fourth time. Three of the six medalists, including both winners, represented the Netherlands.

Rules 
All 24 participating skaters were allowed to skate the first three distances; only 8 skaters took part on the fourth and longest distance. These 8 skaters were determined by taking the standings on the longest of the first three distances, as well as the samalog standings after three distances, and comparing these lists as follows:

 Skaters among the top 8 on both lists were qualified.
 To make up a total of 8, skaters were then added in order of their best rank on either list. Samalog standings take precedence over the longest-distance standings in the event of a tie. Skaters trying to qualify by their longest-distance standing have to be in the top 16 of the samalog.

Schedule
All times are local.

Medal winners

Medal table

Men

Allround results

Women

Allround results

References

External links 
 Official website

World Allround Speed Skating Championships, 2013
2013 World Allround
World Allround Speed Skating Championships
World Allround, 2013
Sport in Hamar